LG G3 Stylus is an Android smartphone developed by LG Electronics. It is a low-end phablet modeled after the design of the LG G3, and includes a stylus pen that can be used for drawing and touch input.

Reception 
NDTV Gadgets noted that the G3 Stylus, despite its name, was not built to the same specifications of the G3, acknowledging its lower resolution display, a "fairly pedestrian" processor, and for lacking additional design details present on the G3. The stylus was criticized for only being a "passive" accessory with no special support in the device's software for detecting when it is in use or for pressure sensitivity (similarly to the Galaxy Note series), beyond apps that happened to make sense for use with a stylus, such as QuickMemo. The camera was considered "decent though not especially impressive", believing that it was sufficient for casual online sharing. In conclusion, the G3 Stylus was described as being a "nice enough phone", but overpriced in comparison to similar devices with better specifications.

References 

Android (operating system) devices
LG Electronics smartphones
Mobile phones introduced in 2014
Mobile phones with stylus
Mobile phones with user-replaceable battery
Discontinued smartphones